Władysław Franciszek Jabłonowski (25 October 1769 – 29 September 1802) was a Polish general and military commander, who fought for France during the Napoleonic Wars. He is the first known Polish general of African descent.

After enlisting in the colonial service, he died of yellow fever in 1802 in Saint-Domingue, where the Polish Legionnaires were initially fighting with the French against former enslaved African Haitians seeking freedom. Many other French and Poles died of yellow fever and Napoleon withdrew his surviving forces.

Some of the Polish soldiers allied with the slaves in their quest for freedom, and about 400–500 settled on the island after the war. They were granted full citizenship by Jean-Jacques Dessalines, who led the country.

Early life
Of mixed ancestry, Władysław was the illegitimate child of Maria Dealire, an English aristocrat, and an unidentified man of African descent. He acquired the nickname "Murzynek". Maria Dealire's husband, the Polish nobleman Konstanty Jabłonowski, accepted the boy as his son and gave him his family name, so he was considered Polish.

In 1783 Jabłonowski as a youth was admitted to the French military academy at Paris École Militaire. There he was a schoolmate of Napoleon Bonaparte and Louis Nicolas D'avout. In a climate of bullying, he was subjected to racist taunts, including from Napoleon. On graduation he joined the Régiment de Royal-Allemand, where he attained the rank of lieutenant.

Military career
In 1794 Jabłonowski fought in Tadeusz Kościuszko's uprising against Tsarist Russia. He participated in battles of Szczekociny, Warsaw, Maciejowice, and at Praga. In 1799 he was made General of Brigade of the  Polish legions.

From 1801 he was the leader of Legia Naddunajska. He enlisted in the colonial forces to serve in Louisiana or Saint-Domingue. He was sent at his own request to Saint-Domingue in May 1802 to assist French forces (before Napoleon recruited more of the Polish legions to assist his French forces), and was accompanied by his common-law wife Anne Penot. There he worked to put down the Haitian Revolution being waged by formerly enslaved Africans. Jabłonowski died from yellow fever on 29 September 1802 in Jérémie, three weeks after more Legionnaires landed but before he had seen any.

The disease caused many deaths among both French and Polish forces, killing more than those who died because of warfare. Eventually some 400 of the surviving Polish Legions (who started with 5200 soldiers) abandoned the French and joined the slaves in their fight for freedom. They settled in what became Haiti, where their descendants are known as Polish Haitians.

In Polish culture
Jabłonowski is mentioned in Adam Mickiewicz's notable epic poem Pan Tadeusz, in the context of a veteran of the Polish legions recounting what he had seen:
how Jabłonowski had reached the land where the pepper grows
and where sugar is produced, and where in eternal spring'bloom fragrant woods: with the legion of the Danube therethe Polish general smites the Negroes, but sighs for his native soil''

References

1769 births
1802 deaths
Deaths from yellow fever
Kościuszko insurgents
Polish commanders of the Napoleonic Wars
Polish generals in other armies
Wladyslaw Franciszek
Infectious disease deaths in Haiti
Polish people of African descent
Polish people of English descent
Generals of the Polish Legions (Napoleonic period)
Black commanders of the Napoleonic Wars